Beth Bader (born August 30, 1973) is an American professional golfer who has played on the LPGA Tour. Bader competed on the Tour for more than a decade, and her highest career finish was a tie for fourth at the 2007 LPGA Corning Classic. She made more than $1 million in career earnings.

After attending Iowa State University, Bader played on the Futures Tour for four years before gaining her LPGA Tour card at the 2000 LPGA Final Qualifying Tournament. In her second LPGA season, 2002, she posted a top-five result at the Giant Eagle LPGA Classic. Having finished 90th and 91st, respectively, in the 2002 and 2003 season money lists, Bader fell to 113th in 2004. At the 2004 LPGA Final Qualifying Tournament, she won her card for the following year. Bader earned over $100,000 in 2005 and 2006, and made a career-high $286,761 in 2007. She was 119th on the money list in 2008, down from 46th the previous year. In 2009, her earnings of over $125,000 placed her 74th on the Tour. Over the next four years, Bader did not finish higher than 119th in annual earnings.

In 2006, Bader was inducted into the Iowa State Cyclones Hall of Fame.

Results in LPGA majors

CUT = missed the half-way cut
"T" = tied

Source:

LPGA Tour career summary

Official as of 2013 season. Sources:

References

External links

Official website of her charitable foundation

American female golfers
LPGA Tour golfers
Golfers from Iowa
Iowa State Cyclones women's golfers
Sportspeople from Davenport, Iowa
1973 births
Living people
21st-century American women